An important parameter in wet scrubbing systems is the rate of liquid flow. It is common in wet scrubber terminology to express the liquid flow as a function of the gas flow rate that is being treated. This is commonly called the liquid-to-gas ratio (L/G ratio) and uses the units of gallons per 1,000 actual cubic feet or litres per cubic metre (L/m3). 

Expressing the amount of liquid used as a ratio enables systems of different sizes to be readily compared.
For particulate removal, the liquid-to-gas ratio is a function of the mechanical design of the system; while for gas absorption this ratio gives an indication of the difficulty of removing a pollutant. Most wet scrubbers used for particulate control operate with liquid-to-gas ratios in the range of 4 to 20 gallons per 1,000 actual cubic foot (0.5 to 3 litres per actual cubic metre). 

Depending on scrubber design, a minimum volume of liquid is required to "wet" the scrubber internals and create sufficient collection targets. After a certain optimum point, adding excess liquid to a particulate wet scrubber does not increase efficiency and in fact, could be counter-productive by causing excessive pressure loss. Liquid-to-gas ratios for gas absorption are often higher, in the range of 20 to 40 gallons per 1,000 actual cubic foot (3 to 6 litres per actual cubic metre).

L/G ratio illustrates a number of points about the choice of wet scrubbers used for gas absorption. For example, because flue-gas desulfurization systems must deal with heavy particulate loadings, open, simple designs (such as venturi, spray chamber and moving bed) are used.
Also, the liquid-to-gas ratio for the absorption process is higher than for particle removal and gas velocities are kept low to enhance the absorption process.

Solubility is a very important factor affecting the amount of a pollutant that can be absorbed. Solubility governs the amount of liquid required (liquid-to-gas ratio) and the necessary contact time. More soluble gases require less liquid. Also, more soluble gases will be absorbed faster.

Bibliography
 Bethea, R. M. 1978. Air Pollution Control Technology. New York: Van Nostrand Reinhold.
 National Asphalt Pavement Association. 1978. The Maintenance and Operation of Exhaust Systems in the Hot Mix Batch Plant. 2nd ed. Information Series 52.
 Perry, J. H. (Ed.). 1973. Chemical Engineers’ Handbook. 5th ed. New York: McGraw-Hill.
 Richards, J. R. 1995. Control of Particulate Emissions (APTI Course 413). U.S. Environmental Protection Agency.
 Richards, J. R. 1995. Control of Gaseous Emissions. (APTI Course 415). U.S. Environmental Protection Agency.
 Schifftner, K. C. 1979, April. Venturi scrubber operation and maintenance. Paper presented at the U.S. EPA Environmental Research Information Center. Atlanta, GA.
 Semrau, K. T. 1977. Practical process design of particulate scrubbers. Chemical Engineering. 84:87-91.
 U.S. Environmental Protection Agency. 1982, September. Control Techniques for Particulate Emissions from Stationary Sources. Vol. 1. EPA 450/3-81-005a.
 Wechselblatt, P. M. 1975. Wet scrubbers (particulates). In F. L. Cross and H. E. Hesketh (Eds.), Handbook for the Operation and Maintenance of Air Pollution Control Equipment. Westport: Technomic Publishing.

See also
 Expansion ratio

References

Separation processes
Air pollution